Patricia A. Hajdu  (born November 3, 1966) is a Canadian politician who has served as the minister of Indigenous services since October 26, 2021. A member of the Liberal Party, she also serves as the member of Parliament for Thunder Bay—Superior North. Previously, she was the minister of status of women, minister of employment, workforce development and labour, and minister of health.

Early life and education
Born in Montreal, she spent her early years in Chisholm, Minnesota, U.S. with her brother Sean Patrick Hajdu (1969–2003), raised by her aunt and uncle. Her Hungarian last name comes from her stepfather.

At 12 years old, Hajdu moved to Thunder Bay to live with her mother. Due to a tumultuous relationship, she ended up living on her own at age 16, attempting to finish high school. After graduating from high school, she got a job in Thunder Bay through an employment insurance initiative, at a non-profit adult-literacy group, where she trained in graphic design.

Hajdu then attended Lakehead University, graduating with a Bachelor of Arts. In 2015, she received a Master of Public Administration from the University of Victoria.

Career
Hajdu worked mainly in the field of harm prevention, homelessness, and substance misuse prevention, including nine years as the head of the drug awareness committee of the Thunder Bay District Health Unit. She also worked as a creative director and graphic designer in marketing. Prior to her election in 2015 she was the executive director at Shelter House, the city's largest homeless shelter.

On November 4, 2015, she was appointed the Minister of Status of Women in the federal Cabinet, headed by Prime Minister Justin Trudeau. In this capacity, she convened in July 2016 an advisory council to help develop of Canada's strategy against gender-based violence. She was sworn in as Minister of Employment, Workforce Development and Labour on January 10, 2017.

On October 29, 2018, Minister Hajdu, alongside Status of Women Minister Maryam Monsef and President of the Treasury Board and Minister for Digital Government Scott Brison, introduced pay equity legislation for federally regulated workplaces.

Minister of Health 
Hajdu was shuffled to Minister of Health in the Trudeau government following the 2019 federal election.

COVID-19 pandemic response 
As Minister of Health, Hajdu oversaw the Department of Health Canada and the Public Health Agency of Canada, key agencies coordinating the Canadian government's response to the COVID-19 pandemic in Canada.

On March 25, 2020, Hajdu informed the Senate that she would invoke the Quarantine Act effective at midnight, federally mandating that all travellers (excluding essential workers) returning to the country must self-isolate for 14 days, prohibiting those who are symptomatic from using public transit as transport to their place of self-isolation, and prohibiting self-isolation in settings where they may come in contact with those who are vulnerable (people with pre-existing conditions and the elderly).

Personal life
Hajdu is the mother of two adult sons.

Electoral record

References

External links
 
 Bio & mandate from the Prime Minister
 

1966 births
Living people
Activists from Montreal
Women government ministers of Canada
Women members of the House of Commons of Canada
Anglophone Quebec people
Canadian Ministers of Health
Homelessness activists
Lakehead University alumni
Liberal Party of Canada MPs
Members of the 29th Canadian Ministry
Members of the House of Commons of Canada from Ontario
Members of the King's Privy Council for Canada
Ministers of Labour of Canada
Politicians from Thunder Bay
Politicians from Montreal
University of Victoria alumni
Women in Ontario politics
21st-century Canadian women politicians